Albert Winterton White (1889-1965) was an English cricketer active from 1914 to 1923 who played for Northamptonshire (Northants). He was born in Wellingborough on 10 January 1889 and died in Rushden on 9 March 1965. White appeared in eight first-class matches as a righthanded batsman. He scored 139 runs with a highest score of 29.

Notes

1889 births
1965 deaths
English cricketers
Northamptonshire cricketers
People from Wellingborough